Chala is a village in the Ozurgeti Municipality of Guria in western Georgia.

References

External links

Populated places in Ozurgeti Municipality